Negative elongation factor A is a protein that in humans is encoded by the WHSC2 gene.

Function 

This gene is expressed ubiquitously with higher levels in fetal than in adult tissues. It encodes a protein sharing 93% sequence identity with the mouse protein. Wolf-Hirschhorn syndrome (WHS) is a malformation syndrome associated with a hemizygous deletion of the distal short arm of chromosome 4. This gene is mapped to the 165 kb WHS critical region, and may play a role in the phenotype of the WHS or Pitt-Rogers-Danks syndrome. The encoded protein is found to be capable of reacting with HLA-A2-restricted and tumor-specific cytotoxic T lymphocytes, suggesting a target for use in specific immunotherapy for a large number of cancer patients. This protein has also been shown to be a member of the NELF (negative elongation factor) protein complex that participates in the regulation of RNA polymerase II transcription elongation.  WHSC2 encodes the NELF-A subunit of the NELF complex.

Interactions 

WHSC2 has been shown to interact with RDBP.

References

Further reading